Northampton is the county town of Northamptonshire in England.

Northampton may also refer to:

Australia 
 Northampton, Western Australia

Canada 
 Northampton Parish, New Brunswick
 Northampton, New Brunswick, an unincorporated community

England 
 John Northampton was mayor of London from 1381 to 1383
 Northampton, Northamptonshire

United States 

Towns and cities:
 Northampton, Massachusetts, college town and county seat of Hampshire County, Massachusetts
 Union Station (Northampton, Massachusetts)
 North Hampton, New Hampshire
 Northampton, Fulton County, New York
 Northampton, Suffolk County, New York
 Northampton, Pennsylvania
 Northampton (Hampton, Virginia), a neighborhood

See also:
 North Hampton (disambiguation)

Township:
Northampton Township, Bucks County, Pennsylvania
Northampton Township, Somerset County, Pennsylvania

Counties:
 Northampton County, North Carolina
 Northampton County, Pennsylvania
 Northampton County, Virginia

Ships 
 Northampton (East Indiaman), two ships
 USS Northampton (CLC-1)
 USS Northampton, an index of ships by this name

Other
 Marquess of Northampton, a title in the British peerage
 Northampton (UK Parliament constituency)
 Northampton (album), a 2006 album by Enter the Haggis
 Alternative name for the hymn tune "Cranbrook"

English toponymic surnames